Rufina Ubah (also spelled Uba; born 4 April 1959) is a former Nigerian sprinter who specialised in the 100 metres.

Ubah finished fourth in 4 x 100 metres relay at the 1991 World Championships, together with teammates Beatrice Utondu, Christy Opara-Thompson and Mary Onyali-Omagbemi.

On the individual level, Ubah won a bronze medal at the 1991 All-Africa Games.

International competitions

External links

1959 births
Living people
Nigerian female sprinters
Olympic athletes of Nigeria
Athletes (track and field) at the 1980 Summer Olympics
Athletes (track and field) at the 1982 Commonwealth Games
Commonwealth Games competitors for Nigeria
World Athletics Championships athletes for Nigeria
African Games bronze medalists for Nigeria
African Games medalists in athletics (track and field)
Athletes (track and field) at the 1991 All-Africa Games
Olympic female sprinters
20th-century Nigerian women